William Charnley (born 1895) was an English footballer who played in the Football League for Stoke.

Career
Charnley was born in Kirkham, Lancashire but began his football career with Scottish side Aberdeen. His only appearance for the Dons came in a 2–1 friendly win against Albion Rovers.  He joined Stoke in 1919 and played twice in the Football League. He failed to break into the first team and was released, he returned north of the border to Musselburgh.

Career statistics

References

English footballers
Aberdeen F.C. players
Stoke City F.C. players
English Football League players
1895 births
People from Kirkham, Lancashire
Year of death missing
Association football wingers